The Nogais (Nogai: Ногай,  Ногайлар) are a Turkic ethnic group who live in the North Caucasus region. Most are found in Northern Dagestan and Stavropol Krai, as well as in Karachay-Cherkessia and Astrakhan Oblast; some also live in Chechnya, Dobruja (Romania and Bulgaria), Turkey, Kazakhstan, Uzbekistan, Ukraine and a small Nogai diaspora is found in Jordan. They speak the Nogai language and are descendants of various Mongolic and Turkic tribes who formed the Nogai Horde. There are seven main groups of Nogais: the Ak Nogai, the Karagash, the Kuban-Nogai, the Kundraw-Nogai, the Qara-Nogai, the Utars and the Yurt-Nogai.

Name
For a long time it was believed that their namesake founder was Nogai Khan ( 'dog' in Mongolian), a grandson of Jochi. Nogai (d. 1299–1300) was the de facto ruler, kingmaker, and briefly self-proclaimed khan of the Golden Horde.

Geographic distribution
In the 1990s, 65,000 were still living in the Northern Caucasus, divided into Aq (White) Nogai and Qara (Black) Nogai tribal confederations. Nogais live in the territories of Dagestan, Chechnya, Stavropol district and Astrakhan Oblast. From 1928 there was a Nogaysky District, Republic of Dagestan and from 2007 a Nogaysky District, Karachay-Cherkess Republic.

A few thousand Nogais live in Dobruja (today in Romania), in the town of Mihail Kogălniceanu (Karamurat) and villages of Lumina (Kocali), Valea Dacilor (Hendekkarakuyusu), Cobadin (Kubadin).

An estimated 90,000 Nogais live in Turkey today, mainly settled in Ceyhan/Adana, Ankara and Eskisehir provinces. The Nogai language is still spoken in some of the villages of Central Anatolia - mainly around the Salt Lake, Eskişehir and Ceyhan. To this day, Nogais in Turkey have maintained their cuisine: Üken börek, kasık börek, tabak börek, şır börek, köbete and Nogay şay (Nogai tea - a drink prepared by boiling milk and tea together with butter, salt and pepper).

The Junior Juz or the Lesser Horde of the Kazakhs occupied the lands of the former Nogai Khanate in Western Kazakhstan. A part of Nogais joined Kazakhs in 17-18th centuries and formed separate clan or tribe called as Kazakh-Nogais. Their estimated number is about 50,000.

Subgroups
From the sixteenth century until their deportation in the mid-nineteenth century the Nogais living along the Black Sea northern coast were divided into the following sub-groups (west to east):
Bucak (Budjak) Nogais inhabited the area from Danube to Dniester.
Cedsan (Yedisan) Nogais inhabited the land from Dniester to Southern Bug.
Camboyluk (Jamboyluk) Nogais inhabited in the lands from Bug to the beginning of Crimean Peninsula.
Cedişkul (Jedishkul) Nogais inhabited the north of Crimean peninsula.
Kuban Nogais inhabited the north of Sea of Azov around Prymorsk (previously Nogaisk).

History

The name Nogai derives from Nogai Khan (died 1299/1300, great-great-grandson of Genghis Khan), a general of the Golden Horde
(also called the Kipchak Khanate).
The Mongol tribe called the Manghits (Manghut) constituted a core of the Nogai Horde. The Nogai Horde supported the Astrakhan Khanate, and after the conquest of Astrakhan in 1556 by Russians, they transferred their allegiance to the Crimean Khanate. The Nogais protected the northern borders of the Crimean khanate, and through organized raids to the Wild Fields inhibited Slavic settlement. Many Nogais migrated to the Crimean peninsula to serve as the Crimean khans' cavalry.  Settling there, they contributed to the formation of the Crimean Tatars. They raised various herds and migrated seasonally in search of better pastures for their animals. Nogais were proud of their nomadic traditions and independence, which they considered superior to settled agricultural life.

The recorded history of the Nogais first commenced when representatives of the Ottoman Empire reached the Terek–Kuma Lowland, where the Nogais were living as rogue clans and herders. Yusuf Mirza supported joining the Ottomans. However, his brother Ismail Mirza, who was allied with the Russians, ambushed Yusuf and declared his chiefdom under Russian rule. After that, the supporters of Yusuf Mirza migrated to Crimea and Yedisan, joining the Crimean Khanate. Supporters of Yusuf took the name Qara, later named by Crimeans as Kichi (Small - founded in 1557 by ). Those who remained in present-day West Kazakhstan and the North Caucasus (the ) took the name Uly (Strong).

About 500,000 Nogais migrated to present-day Turkey around the 16th century, after the fall of the Nogai Horde. They settled in the following cities: Şanlıurfa, Gaziantep, Kırşehir, Eskişehir, Adana, Kahramanmaraş, Afyon, Bursa. These Nogais do not speak the Nogai language anymore and some of them are not aware of their ancestry; however their villages do have Nogai customs.

At the beginning of the 17th century, the ancestors of the Kalmyks, the Oirats, migrated from the steppes of southern Siberia on the banks of the Irtysh River to the Lower Volga region. Various theories attempt to explain this move, but the generally accepted view is that the Kalmyks sought abundant pastures for their herds. They reached the Volga about 1630. That land, however, was not uncontested pasture, but rather the homeland of the Nogai Horde. The Kalmyks expelled the Nogais, who fled to the Northern Caucasian Plains and to the Crimean Khanate, areas under the control of the Ottoman Empire. Some Nogai groups sought the protection of the Russian garrison at Astrakhan. The remaining nomadic Turkic tribes became vassals of the Kalmyk khan.

After the Russian annexation of Crimea in 1783, Slavic and other settlers occupied the Nogai pastoral land, since the Nogais did not have permanent residence. In the 1770s and 1780s the Russian Empress Catherine the Great resettled approximately 120,000 Nogais from Bessarabia and areas northeast of the Sea of Azov to the Kuban and the Caucasus. In 1790, during the Russo-Turkish war, Prince Grigory Potemkin ordered the resettlement of some Nogai families from the Caucasus (where, he feared, they might defect to the Ottomans) to the north shore of the Sea of Azov.
With the 1792 Treaty of Jassy (Iaşi) the Russian frontier expanded to the Dniester River and the Russian takeover of Yedisan was complete. The 1812 Treaty of Bucharest transferred Budjak to Russian control.

After confiscating the land previously belonged to Nogais, the Russian government forced Nogais to settle through various methods, such as burning their tents and limiting their freedom of movement. The Russian general Alexander Suvorov slaughtered thousands of rebellious Kuban Nogais in 1783. Several Nogai tribes took refuge among the Circassians in this period. Several other Nogai clans began to migrate to the Ottoman Empire in great numbers. The Nogais followed two routes. An estimated 7,000 Nogais of the Bucak and Cedsan Hordes settled in Dobruja before 1860. Most of these Nogais later migrated to Anatolia. However, the great exodus of the Nogais took place in 1860. Many clans from the Camboyluk and Kuban Hordes moved westwards to southern Ukraine, and wintered with their co-ethnics there in 1859. They induced the Nogais of Crimea (who lived in the districts of Yevpatoria, Perekop and in the north of Simferopol) to emigrate too. 300,000 Crimean Tatars (which included  Nogais) left Crimea in the year 1860. Similarly, 50,000 Nogais disappeared from southern Ukraine by 1861. Other Nogai clans emigrated directly from the Caucasus to Anatolia, together with the Circassians. Nogais lived alongside German-speaking Mennonites in the Molochna region of southern Ukraine from 1803, when the Mennonites first arrived there, until 1860, when the Nogais were deported.

Notable Nogais

 Cüneyt Arkın, film actor
 Albert Batyrgaziev, boxer, Olympic gold medalist
 Arslanbek Sultanbekov, musician

See also
Little Tartary
Tatars of Romania
Manghud
Crimean–Nogai raids into East Slavic lands
Karagash
Nağaybäk

References

External links
 Crimean Tatars and Nogais in Turkey
 Nogais Lack of Employment Opportunities in Russia

 
Muslim communities of Russia
Ethnic groups in Russia
Peoples of the Caucasus
Turkic peoples of Asia
Turkic peoples of Europe
Muslim communities of the Caucasus